The Ubajara National Park is a national park in the state of Ceará, Brazil.
It is the smallest of the 35 national parks of Brazil and is known for the Ubajara grotto.

Location

The park is in the Caatinga biome.
It was created by decree 45.954 of 30 April 1959, modified on 26 April 1973 and 13 December 2002.
The park is administered by the Chico Mendes Institute for Biodiversity Conservation.
It lies in the municipalities of Ubajara, Tianguá and Frecheirinha in Ceará.
The park adjoins the  Serra da Ibiapaba Environmental Protection Area to the west.

The park is in the western edge of Ceará peripheral depression and the Ibiapaba plateau.
The flora include remnants of the original forest as well as secondary growth and exotics.

Conservation

The park is classified as IUCN protected area category II (national park).
It has the objectives of preserving natural ecosystems of great ecological relevance and scenic beauty, enabling scientific research, environmental education, outdoors recreation and eco-tourism.
Protected species in the park include the oncilla (Leopardus tigrinus), cougar (Puma concolor), Maranhão red-handed howler (Alouatta ululata),  the variable antshrike (Thamnophilus caerulescens) and the frogs Adelophryne baturitensis and Adelophryne maranguapensis.

Ubajara grotto

Set in a hillside in the Ibiapaba Mountains, 320 kilometres from Fortaleza, the grotto has impressive stalactite and stalagmite formations, the result of nature's patient work with limestone and water over many thousands of years - each centimetre of crystallised growth takes three years to form.
Access to the grotto is by a chairlift. The park has waterfalls and paths through the forest. Visits are supervised by Ibama, the national body for environmental conservation, and must be arranged in advance. Other attractions in the Ibiapaba mountains include Morro do Céu, 820 metres high, and Pedra de Itagurussu, the source of the Pirangi waterfall.

Notes

Sources

1959 establishments in Brazil
National parks of Brazil
Protected areas of Ceará
Caatinga